Sublime Frequencies is a record label based in Seattle, Washington that focuses exclusively on "acquiring and exposing obscure sights and sounds from modern and traditional urban and rural frontiers," mostly from Southeast Asia, North Africa and West Africa and the Middle East.

The releases are usually divided into four categories: field recordings, folk and pop compilations, radio collages from specific geographic locales, and DVDs. The label is headed by Alan Bishop and Hisham Mayet. Its releases are produced in limited quantities, usually up to a thousand copies.

Its mission statement is:  Sublime Frequencies is a collective of explorers dedicated to acquiring and exposing obscure sights and sounds from modern and traditional urban and rural frontiers via film and video, field recordings, radio and short wave transmissions, international folk and pop music, sound anomalies, and other forms of human and natural expression not documented sufficiently through all channels of academic research, the modern recording industry, media, or corporate foundations. Sublime Frequencies is focused on an aesthetic of extra-geography and soulful experience inspired by music and culture, world travel, research.

In 2014 Sublime Frequencies created a Bandcamp page where listeners can listen to and purchase digital copies of some albums or individual tracks, including some previously sold-out albums. In 2016 E. Tammy Kim and Michael E. Veal published Punk Ethnography: Artists & Scholars Listen to Sublime Frequencies which is a collection of interviews and essays about the label.

Releases
List up-to-date .

CDs
SF 001 - Folk and Pop Sounds of Sumatra Vol.1
SF 002 - Radio Java
SF 003 - Night Recordings From Bali
SF 006 - Princess Nicotine: Folk and Pop Music of Myanmar (Burma)
SF 007 - Radio Morocco
SF 008 - Radio Palestine: Sounds of the Eastern Mediterranean
SF 009 - I Remember Syria 2-CD
SF 011 - Cambodian Cassette Archives: Khmer Folk & Pop music Vol. 1
SF 012 - Bush Taxi Mali: Field Recordings From Mali
SF 013 - Brokenhearted Dragonflies: Insect Electronica from Southeast Asia
SF 014 - Radio India: The Eternal Dream of Sound 2-CD
ANOM26 - Leaf Music, Drunks, Distant Drums 
SF 016 - Streets of Lhasa
SF 017 - Harmika Yab Yum: Folk Sounds From Nepal
SF 018 - Folk and Pop Sounds of Sumatra Vol. 2
SF 019 - Molam: Thai Country Groove From Isan
SF 020 - Radio Phnom Penh
SF 021 - Radio Sumatra: The Indonesian FM Experience
SF 023 - Radio Pyongyang: Commie Funk and Agit Pop from the Hermit Kingdom
SF 024 - Guitars of the Golden Triangle: Folk and Pop Music of Myanmar Vol. 2
SF 025 - Choubi Choubi! Folk and Pop Sounds from Iraq
SF 027 - Ethnic Minority Music of Northeast Cambodia
SF 028 - Radio Thailand: Transmissions from the Tropical Kingdom 2-CD
SF 029 - Radio Algeria 
SF 030 - Group Doueh: Guitar Music From The Western Sahara
SF 031 - Omar Souleyman: Highway to Hassake (Folk and Pop Sounds of Syria)
SF 032 - Thai Pop Spectacular (1960s-1980s)
SF 033 - Molam: Thai Country Groove From Isan Vol. 2
SF 034 - Group Inerane: Guitars From Agadez (Music of Niger)
SF 035 - Music of Nat Pwe: Folk and Pop Music of Myanmar Vol. 3
SF 036 - Ethnic Minority Music of Southern Laos 
SF 037 - Ethnic Minority Music of North Vietnam
SF 038 - Proibidão C.V: Forbidden Gang Funk From Rio de Janeiro 
SF 039 - Latinamericarpet: Exploring the Vinyl Warp of Latin American Psychedelia Vol. 1
SF 043 - Bollywood Steel Guitar
SF 044 - Radio Myanmar (Burma)
SF 045 - 1970's Algerian Proto-Rai Underground
SF 049 - Omar Souleyman: Dabke 2020 (Folk and Pop Sounds of Syria)
SF 050 - Siamese Soul: Thai Pop Spectacular Vol. 2
SF 051 - Singapore A-Go-Go
SF 052 - Omar Khorshid: Guitar El Chark (Guitar of the Orient)
SF 053 - Koes Bersaudara 1967
SF 054 - Dara Puspita 1966-1968
SF 055 - Omar Souleyman: Jazeera Nights
SF 057 - Ethnic Minority Music of Northwest Xinjiang (China)
SF 058 - Koes Plus Volumes 1 & 2 (1969-1970)
SF 059 - My Friend Rain
SF 060 - Saigon Rock & Soul: Vietnamese Classic Tracks 1968-1974
SF 061 - Group Inerane: Guitars From Agadez Vol 3
SF 062 - Hayvanlar Alemi: Guarana Superpower
SF 065 - Staring Into The Sun DVD/CD/Book
SF 066 - Group Doueh: Zayna Jumma
SF 067 - Erkin Koray: Mechul (Singles and Rarities)
SF 068 - Omar Souleyman: Haflat Gharbia (The Western Concerts)
SF 079 - CD Pop Yeh Yeh: Psychedelic Rock from Singapore and Malaysia 1964-1970
SF 081 - Ethnic Minority Music of Southern China
SF 086 - Radio Niger
SF 088 - 1970s Algerian Folk & Pop
SF 095 - Radio Vietnam
SF 099 - INDIAN TALKING MACHINE: 78rpm and Gramophone Collecting on the Sub-Continent Book + 2CD
SF 101 - Music Of Xinjiang
SF 102 - Outlier: Recordings From Madagascar
SF 104 - Burkina Faso: Volume 2
SF 110 - The Photographs Of Charles Duvelle - Disques OCORA And Collection PROPHET (2CD + Book)
SF 112 - Deben Bhattacharya	Paris To Calcutta (Men And Music On The Desert Road) (4CD + Book)
SF 113 - Baba Commandant & The Mandingo Band - Sira Ba Kele
SF 114 - Senyawa - Sujud
SF 115 - Sound Storing Machines: The First 78rpm Records From Japan, 1903-1912

DVDs
SF 004 - Nat Pwe: Burma's Carnival of Spirit Soul
SF 005 - Jemaa El Fna: Morocco's Rendezvous of the Dead
SF 010 - Folk Music of the Sahara: Among the Tuareg of Libya
SF 015 - Isan: Folk and Pop Music of Northeast Thailand 
SF 022 - Niger: Magic and Ecstasy in the Sahel
SF 026 - Phi Ta Khon: Ghosts of Isan
SF 040 - Sumatran Folk Cinema
SF 041 - Musical Brotherhoods From The Trans-Saharan Highway
SF 047 - Palace of the Winds
SF 059 - My Friend Rain
SF 065 - Staring Into The Sun DVD/CD/Book
SF 073 - This World Is Unreal Like A Snake In A Rope
SF 075 - The Divine River: Ceremonial Pageantry In The Sahel
SF 080 - The Pierced Heart and the Machete
SF 082 - Small Path Music (With Laurent Jeanneau)
SF 089 - Vodoun Gods On The Slave Coast
SF 094 - The Stirring of a Thousand Bells

LPs
SF 001 - Folk and Pop Sounds of Sumatra Vol 1 LP
SF 006 - Princess Nicotine: Folk and Pop Sounds of Myanmar (Burma) Vol 1 LP
SF 011 - Cambodian Cassette Archives: Khmer Folk & Pop music Vol. 1 2-LP
SF 019 - Molam: Thai Country Groove From Isan
SF 025 - Choubi Choubi! Folk and Pop Sounds from Iraq 2LP
SF 030 - Group Doueh: Guitar Music From The Western Sahara
SF 031 - Omar Souleyman: Highway to Hassake (Folk and Pop Sounds of Syria) 2-LP
SF 034 - Group Inerane: Guitars From Agadez (Music of Niger)
SF 042 - Shadow Music Of Thailand
SF 043 - Bollywood Steel Guitar
SF 045 - 1970's Algerian Proto-Rai Underground
SF 046 - Group Bombino - Guitars From Agadez, Vol. 2
SF 048 - Group Doueh: Treeg Salaam
SF 052 - Omar Khorshid: Guitar El Chark (Guitar of the Orient)
SF 056 - Ecstatic Music of the Jemaa El Fna
SF 060 - Saigon Rock & Soul: Vietnamese Classic Tracks 1968-1974
SF 061 - Group Inerane: Guitars From Agadez Vol 3
SF 062 - Hayvanlar Alemi: Guarana Superpower
SF 063 - Group Doueh: Beatte Harab
SF 064 - Pakistan: Folk & Pop Instrumentals 1966 - 1976
SF 066 - Group Doueh - Zayna Jumma
SF 067 - Erkin Koray: Mechul (Singles and Rarities)
SF 068 - Omar Souleyman: Haflat Gharbia (The Western Concerts)
SF 071 - Eat the Dream: Gnawa Music from Essaouira
SF 074 - Staring into the Sun: Ethiopian Tribal Music
SF 077 - Scattered Melodies: Korean Kayagum Sanjo
SF 078 - The Crying Princess: 78 rpm Records From Burma
SF 083 - Hassānīya Music from the Western Sahara and Mauritania
SF 084 - Koudede: Guitars from Agadez Vol. 7
SF 085 - Choubi Choubi! Folk and Pop Sounds From Iraq Vol. 2
SF 087 - Rajasthan Street Music
SF 088 - 1970s Algerian Folk & Pop 
SF 090 - Folk Music Of The Sahel Vol.1: Niger 2-LP
SF 091 - Omar Khorshid and his Group: Live In Australia 1981
SF 092 - The Traveling Archive- Folk Music From Bengal
SF 093 - A Distant Invitation: Ceremonial Street Recordings from Burma, Cambodia, India, Indonesia, Malaysia, and Thailand
SF 096 - Music Of Tanzania 2-LP
SF 097 - Baba Commandant and the Mandingo Band - Juguya 
SF 098 - Adnan Othman - Bersyukor: A Retrospective of Hits by a Malaysian Pop Yeh Yeh Legend 
SF 101 - Music of Xinjiang: Uyghur and Kazakh Music from Northwest Xinjiang (China)
SF 102 - Outlier: Recordings from Madagascar

EPs
SF 069 - Group Inerane: Guitars From Agadez Volume. 4
SF 070 - Hayvanlar Alemi - Yekermo Sew
SF 072 - Koudede - Guitars from Agadez Vol. 5
SF 076 - Koudede: Guitars from Agadez Vol. 6

Books
SF 099  - INDIAN TALKING MACHINE: 78rpm and Gramophone Collecting on the Sub-Continent Book + 2CD
SF 112 - Paris to Calcutta (Men and Music on The Desert Road) by Deben Bhattacharya + 4CD (2018)

See also
 List of record labels

References

External links
 
 Sublime Frequencies Bandcamp page
 Dusted magazine's early profile of the label and review of its first batch of releases
 Conversation with Mark Gergis (Sublime Frequencies collaborator) on his sound collection (2011)
 Interview with Mark Gergis (Sublime Frequencies collaborator) on his sound collection (2011)

Ethnomusicology
American record labels
Experimental music record labels